Sir Terence George Streeton  (12 January 1930 – 5 September 2017) was a British diplomat and the former high commissioner to Bangladesh.

References

1930 births
2017 deaths
British diplomats
People from Earls Barton
People educated at Wellingborough School
Companions of the Order of St Michael and St George
Knights Commander of the Order of the British Empire